Martín 'Macoco' de Álzaga (25 January 1901 – 15 November 1982) was an Argentine racecar driver.

He was briefly married to model/actress Kay Williams who would eventually marry and widow actor Clark Gable.

He died in Buenos Aires and is buried at the La Recoleta Cemetery.

References

External links
 http://www.oldracingcars.com/driver/Martin_DeAlzaga

1901 births
1982 deaths
Sportspeople from Mar del Plata
Argentine people of Spanish descent
Argentine racing drivers
Indianapolis 500 drivers
Burials at La Recoleta Cemetery